Braeside School is a historic school at 124 Pierce Road in Highland Park, Illinois. Built in 1928, the Prairie School style school was designed by architect John S. Van Bergen. Van Bergen had worked for Frank Lloyd Wright and mainly designed Prairie School houses, including his own Highland Park home. His plan for the school focused on creating a home-like setting for students, which included large classrooms, natural lighting, and fireplaces. The school has a low, horizontally oriented shape with a hip roof, a characteristic Prairie School form.

The school was added to the National Register of Historic Places on September 29, 1982.

References

National Register of Historic Places in Lake County, Illinois
School buildings on the National Register of Historic Places in Illinois
Prairie School architecture in Illinois
Highland Park, Illinois
School buildings completed in 1928
1928 establishments in Illinois